Monkey orchid is a common name for several plants and may refer to:

 Calanthe tricarinata, native to southeast and east Asia
 Dracula gigas, native to South America
 Dracula simia, native to South America
 Orchis simia, native to Europe and western Asia